The 1938–39 NCAA men's basketball season began in December 1938, progressed through the regular season and conference tournaments, and concluded with the 1939 NCAA basketball tournament championship game on March 27, 1939, at Patten Gymnasium in Evanston, Illinois. The Oregon Webfoots won the first NCAA national championship with a 46–33 victory over the Ohio State Buckeyes.

Rule changes 
After a team makes a free throw as a result of a technical foul, it retains possession and throws the ball in from out of bounds. Previously, a jump ball at center court had taken place after a team shot a free throw as a result of a technical foul.

Season headlines 

 The Skyline Conference began play, with seven original members. The Rocky Mountain Athletic Conference became a non-major conference after the departure of seven of its larger members for the Skyline Conference.
 The practice of naming a Consensus All-American Second Team began.
 The NCAA tournament was held for the first time, operated by the National Association of Basketball Coaches rather than the National Collegiate Athletic Association itself. Eight teams competed. The tournament lost $2,500; although 5,000 fans attended the championship game, many of the tickets were given away. The NCAA viewed its champion as the official national champion, the National Invitation Tournament, which had debuted the previous year, widely was considered the more prestigious of the two tournaments and the "true" national championship tournament through at least the mid-1950s, with better teams often choosing the NIT over the NCAA or playing in both tournaments in the same year.
 The Eastern Intercollegiate Conference and the Northern California Conference both disbanded at the end of the season.
 In February 1943, the Helms Athletic Foundation retroactively selected Long Island, the 1938 National Invitation Tournament winner, as its national champion for the 1938–39 season.
 In 1995, the Premo-Porretta Power Poll retroactively selected Long Island as its national champion for the 1938–39 season.

Conference membership changes

Regular season

Conference winners and tournaments

Statistical leaders

Post-Season Tournaments

NCAA Tournament

Semifinals & finals

National Invitation Tournament

Semifinals & finals 

 Third Place – Bradley 40, St. John's 35

Awards

Consensus All-American teams

Major player of the year awards 

 Helms Player of the Year: Chet Jaworski, Rhode Island State (retroactive selection in 1944)

Other major awards 

 NIT/Haggerty Award (Top player in New York City metro area): Irv Torgoff, Long Island

Coaching changes 

A number of teams changed coaches during the season and after it ended.

References